Pantophaea is a genus of moths in the family Sphingidae. The genus was erected by Karl Jordan in 1946.

Species
Pantophaea favillacea (Walker 1866)
Pantophaea jordani (Joicey & Talbot 1916)
Pantophaea oneili (Clark 1925)

References

Sphingini
Moth genera
Taxa named by Karl Jordan